The following is a list of the 19 cantons of the Charente department, in France, following the French canton reorganisation which came into effect in March 2015:

 Angoulême-1
 Angoulême-2
 Angoulême-3
 Boëme-Échelle
 Boixe-et-Manslois
 Charente-Bonnieure
 Charente-Champagne
 Charente-Nord
 Charente-Sud
 Charente-Vienne
 Cognac-1
 Cognac-2
 La Couronne
 Gond-Pontouvre
 Jarnac
 Touvre-et-Braconne
 Tude-et-Lavalette
 Val de Nouère
 Val de Tardoire

References